This page lists the winners and nominees for the Soul Train Music Stevie Wonder Award for Outstanding Achievement in Songwriting. The award was only given from 2006 to 2007.

Winners
Winners are listed first and highlighted in bold.

2000s

References

Soul Train Music Awards